Aegidius (or Giles or Glig) Tschudi (5 February 150528 February 1572) was a Swiss statesman and historian, an eminent member of the Tschudi family of Glarus, Switzerland. His best known work is the Chronicon Helveticum, a history of the early Swiss Confederation.

Statesman and historian
Having served his native land in various offices, in 1558 he became the chief magistrate or Landarnmann, and in 1559 was ennobled by the Emperor Ferdinand, to whom he had been sent as ambassador.

Originally inclined to moderation, he became later in life more and more devoted to the cause of the Counter-Reformation. It is, however, as the historian of the Swiss Confederation that he is best known. He collected material for three major works, which have never wholly lost their value, though his researches have been largely corrected. In 1538 his book on Rhaetia, written in 1528, was published in Latin and in German: De prisca ac vera Alpina Rhætia, or Die uralt warhafftig Alpisch Rhætia.

Publications and influence
Tschudi's chief works were not published until long after his death. The Beschreibung Galliae Comatae appeared under Frieda Gallati's editorship in 1758, and is mainly devoted to a topographical, historical and antiquarian description of ancient Helvetia and Rhaetia, the latter part being his early work on Rhaetia revised and greatly enlarged. This book was designed practically as an introduction to his magnum opus, the Chronicon Helveticum, part of which (from 1001 to 1470) was published by J. R. Iselin in two stately folios (1734–1736); the rest consists only of rough materials. There exist two rather antiquated biographies of Tschudi by I. Fuchs (2 vols, St Gall, 1805) and C. Vogel (Zürich, 1856).

Tschudi worked from both documents and legends to portray the ancient traditions of Swiss defense of liberty, giving roles not only to  William Tell but to the heroic moment of the foundation of the Confederacy, when Werner Stauffacher representing  Schwyz, Walter Fürst of Uri and Arnold of Melchtal for Unterwalden meet at the Rutli, a meadow above Lake Lucerne, and take an oath to defend Swiss freedom.  Tschudi’s influential text dates that event to 8 November 1307.

Criticism
Down to the latter part of the 19th century Swiss historical writers had largely based their works on his investigations and manuscripts. The historical reputation of Tschudi has suffered after later research. His statements and documents relating to Roman times and the early history of Glarus and his own family had long roused suspicion. Detailed examination has proved that he not merely claimed to have copied Roman inscriptions that had never existed, and amended others in an arbitrary fashion, but that he deliberately forged documents to push back the origin of his family to the 10th century. He thus also entirely misrepresented the early history of Glarus, which is that of a democratic community, and not (as he pretended) that of a preserve of several aristocratic families. Tschudi's historical credit is thus low, and no document printed or historical statement made by him can be accepted without careful verification and examination.

For a summary of these discoveries see Georg von Wyss in the Jahrbuch of the Historical Society of Glarus (1895), vol. xxx., in No. i (1894), of the Anzeiger f. schweizerische Geschichte, and in his Geschichte d. Historiographie in d. Schweiz (1895), pp. 196, 201, 202. The original articles by Vogelin (Roman inscriptions) appeared in vols xi., xiv. and xv. (1886–1890) of the Jahrbuch f. schweizer Geschichte, and that by Schulte (Glarus) in vol. xviii. (1893) of the same periodical. For the defence, see a weak pamphlet, Schulte u. Tschudi (Coire, 1898), by P. C. von Planta.

See also
 Chronicon Helveticum

References

Swiss male writers
1505 births
1572 deaths
Swiss Roman Catholics
16th-century Swiss historians
16th-century Roman Catholics